Anne Alaché Jon Ode (born November 5, 1982), who goes by the stage name Alaché, is a Nigerian-American Christian musician and Christian R&B recording artist from Fairfax, Virginia, who plays a Christian pop style of contemporary R&B and urban contemporary gospel music. She released, The Chronicles of the Mrs., an extended play, in 2015, with M.A.D.E. Entertainment.

Early and personal life
She was born, Anne Alaché Jon Ode, on November 5, 1982, in Nigeria, to an Air Force General father and a mother who is a fashion designer, while has since relocated to Fairfax, Virginia, where she is pursuing her music career and raising her two daughters with her husband, Audu Emmanuel Mark.

Music career
Her music recording career started in 2005, but she did not gain attention until 2015, with the extended play, The Chronicles of the Mrs., on November 27, 2015, from M.A.D.E. Entertainment. She has released one studio album, It Is What It Is: My Life, in 2006, with Naava Music.

Discography
Studio albums
It Is What It Is: My Life (2006, Naava)
EPs
The Chronicles of the Mrs. (November 27, 2015, M.A.D.E.)

References

External links
 Official website

1982 births
Living people
Nigerian Christians
American performers of Christian music
Musicians from Virginia
Songwriters from Virginia